The Taylor Street Bridge was the first Scherzer rolling lift bascule bridge built in Chicago, in the U.S. state of Illinois. It was built in 1900 and demolished in the 1920s.

References

1900 establishments in Illinois
1929 disestablishments in Illinois
Bascule bridges in the United States
Bridges completed in 1900
Bridges in Chicago
Demolished bridges in the United States
Road bridges in Illinois